The Black Horse Tavern is a historic building at 175 North Cove Road in Old Saybrook, Connecticut.   Built c. 1712 by John Burrows, this -story wood-frame structure is one of few early 18th-century buildings still standing in Connecticut, built on land that was among the earliest settled in the area.  Now a private residence, it was listed on the National Register of Historic Places in 1978.

Description and history
The Black Horse Tavern is located near the eastern end of Saybrook Point, a peninsula dividing two coves (North and South Coves) on the west side of the Connecticut River near its mouth at Long Island Sound.  The tavern's location is a short distance west of the site of Fort Saybrook, the first element of the Saybrook Colony, built in 1635.  The tavern is a -story timber-framed structure, with a gabled roof and slightly off-center chimney.  Its main facade is four bays wide, with the entrance in the center-left bay; the chimney is positioned behind the entrance.  The entrance, which features an original vertical board door, is flanked by pilasters and topped by a half-round fanlight, and is sheltered by a gabled portico. The interior layout has a large front-to-back chamber to the right of the chimney, and a parlor and kitchen to the left and behind.

The tavern was built about 1712 by John Burrows, on land originally deeded to John Clark Sr. in 1644.  The North Cove was then coming into use as a shipbuilding center, and the tavern operated by Burrows would have served its workers and travelers moving on the river.  North Cove Road was then also the major road following the western shore of the river, another source of passing travelers.  The building served as a tavern providing services to passing travelers, under a variety of owners, until 1924, and is now a private residence.

See also
List of the oldest buildings in Connecticut
National Register of Historic Places listings in Middlesex County, Connecticut

References

Houses on the National Register of Historic Places in Connecticut
Houses in Old Saybrook, Connecticut
Houses completed in 1712
National Register of Historic Places in Middlesex County, Connecticut
Historic district contributing properties in Connecticut